On 22 April 2018, a bus in North Hwanghae Province, North Korea transporting Chinese tourists fell off a bridge, killing thirty-two Chinese tourists and four North Koreans, who were organized by the Utopia. The cause of the accident was not immediately disclosed.

Accident
The bus was traveling from Kaesong to Pyongyang, when the bus went off of the bridge in the North Hwanghae Province.

Reaction
North Korean leader Kim Jong-un visited the Chinese embassy in Pyongyang to express his condolences regarding the accident.

References

2018 in North Korea
2018 road incidents
Road incidents in North Korea
North Hwanghae
2018 disasters in North Korea